Cerithiella amblytera is a species of very small sea snail, a marine gastropod mollusk in the family Newtoniellidae. It was first described as Cerithium (Bittium) amblyterum by Watson in 1880.

Description 
The maximum recorded shell length is 6.3 mm.

Distribution
This species occurs in the Canary Islands and the Cape Verde archipelago.

Habitat 
Minimum recorded depth is 960 m. Maximum recorded depth is 1234 m.

References

 Bouchet P. & Warén A. (1993). Revision of the Northeast Atlantic bathyal and abyssal Mesogastropoda. Bollettino Malacologico supplemento 3: 579-840
 Gofas, S.; Le Renard, J.; Bouchet, P. (2001). Mollusca, in: Costello, M.J. et al. (Ed.) (2001). European register of marine species: a check-list of the marine species in Europe and a bibliography of guides to their identification. Collection Patrimoines Naturels, 50: pp. 180–213 (
 Rolán E., 2005. Malacological Fauna From The Cape Verde Archipelago. Part 1, Polyplacophora and Gastropoda.

Newtoniellidae
Gastropods described in 1880
Molluscs of the Atlantic Ocean
Gastropods of Cape Verde
Molluscs of the Canary Islands